S. Dana Wolfe is a five-time Emmy Award winning Canadian-born American journalist, television, documentary and debate producer.

A graduate of York University in Toronto, Ontario, Canada and New York University, she earned her master's degree in International Studies from NYU in 1987.

Journalism career
Wolfe began her television career in Toronto at CTV's Canada AM. She was the Assistant Managing Editor at the Washington D.C. based foreign policy journal The National Interest.

Wolfe holds five Emmy Awards earned over a decade as a producer for Ted Koppel’s Nightline on ABC News. Over the course of her career, Wolfe conducted interviews with leading newsmakers, heads of state, and celebrities, including Salman Rushdie, Henry Kissinger, Madeleine Albright, Yasser & Suha Arafat, and Yitzhak Rabin. After her Nightline tenure, Wolfe became an independent media consultant.

In 2015 she joined the board of Retro Report, an innovative documentary news organization, organized under the umbrella of Mirror/Mirror Productions, Inc., a New York not-for-profit corporation. In 2018, she joined the advisory board of the Global Reporting Centre, based at the University of British Columbia. The Centre collaborates with leading reporters and media organizations to spearhead innovative ways to produce solutions-oriented journalism. Wolfe is also a contributing editor at InTELLects.co.

Intelligence Squared U.S. debates and public policy
Wolfe became the Executive Producer of the Intelligence Squared U.S. series in January, 2006 at its inception. The first debate was held in September 2006.

IQ2US was announced as the 2015 winner of the Silver Radio Award for Best Public Affairs Program and the Bronze Radio Award for Best Regularly Scheduled Talk Program by New York Festivals.

In 2013, Wolfe and Intelligence Squared U.S. were recognized by the New York Festivals' World's Best Radio award, earning "Best Public Affairs Program" on radio.

They were recognized again in 2014 and 2015 with awards for Best Public Affairs Program and Regularly Scheduled Talk Program:

Common Core (2015)
Presidential War Powers (2015)
Intelligence Squared (2014)

In 2019 and 2020, Wolfe was a Visiting Fellow at the SNF Agora Institute at Johns Hopkins University. While at the Institute, she taught a course examining the history of U.S. debate and debate techniques, In Search of Intelligent Debate.

Documentary Films

In 2020, Wolfe served as Editorial Producer for the documentary film and five-part series, Lebanon: Borders of Blood. Produced by Zygote Films and winner of six Israeli Television and Motion Pictures Academy Awards, including Best Documentary Series, Borders of Blood examines the decades of unrest and tragedy that has plagued Lebanon since the mid-1970s.

Wolfe is also Editorial Producer and Researcher for The Cassandra Prophecy (2022), a documentary that tells the little-known story of a U.S. Drug Enforcement Administration (DEA) task force investigating the billion dollar cocaine trafficking and money laundering activities of Hezbollah.

Emmy Awards
1994 National News and Documentary Emmy Award Honors, Outstanding instant coverage of a single breaking news story
“The End of the Search for O.J. Simpson” Nightline

1995 News and documentary Emmy Award, Outstanding instant coverage of a single breaking news story, 
Nightline, "Oklahoma City Bombing: Moment of Crisis"

1996 News and documentary Emmy Award, Outstanding general coverage of a single breaking news story (program), Nightline, “Anatomy of the Unabomber Suspect's Arrest”

1998 National News breaking news story Emmy Award
Nightline, “Crisis in the White House: The President Visits the Heartland”

1999 News and Documentary Emmy Award, Outstanding Coverage of a Breaking News Story, Nightline, Lessons Learned: A Jonesboro Town Meeting

Awards

 Alfred I. Dupont – Columbia University Award for excellence in broadcast journalism presented to: ABC News, Nightline Special Programs, The State vs. Simpson: The Verdict; Journey of a country Doctor; Town Meeting: Thou Shall Not Kill, 1995–1996, Dana Wolfe, Producer
 2012 Silver Telly Award for Intelligence Squared U.S., TV/Political/Commentary
 2013 Bronze Telly Award for TV/Political/Commentary, Intelligence Squared U.S.
 2013 Silver Telly Award for Live Events, Intelligence Squared U.S.
 2014 Association for Women in Communications Clarion Award for Radio Regular Feature Program, Intelligence Squared U.S.

Personal life
Wolfe currently lives in Tenafly, New Jersey, with husband Scott Rocco of MSNBC.

References

Living people
Year of birth missing (living people)